Edzná is a Maya archaeological site in the north of the Mexican state of Campeche. The site is open to visitors since the 1970s.

The most remarkable building at the site is the main temple located at the plaza. Built on a platform 40 m high, it provides a wide overview of the surroundings. Another significant building located in the plaza is a ball court. Two parallel structures make up the ball court. The top rooms of the ball court were possibly used to store images of the gods associated with the events, along with items needed for the games.

Edzná was already inhabited in 400 BC, and it was abandoned c. 1500 AD. During the time of occupation, a government was set up whose power was legitimized by the relationship between governors and the deities. In the Late Classic period Edzná was part of the Calakmul polity. Edzná may have been inhabited as early as 600 BC but it took until 200 AD before it developed into a major city.  The word Edzná comes from "House of the Itzaes".  The architectural style of this site shows signs of the Puuc style, even though it is far from the Puuc Hills sites.  The decline and eventual abandonment of Edzná remains a mystery today.

Edzná was discovered in 1907. The first organised excavations started in 1958. In 1986, coordinating agencies began to employ Guatemalan refugees in the excavation, restoration and maintenance at Edzná. This project was funded by various international organizations.

References

External links
 
 Edzná Photo Essay
 Edzná on AmazingTemples.com (en)

Maya sites in Campeche
Former populated places in Mexico
Populated places established in the 3rd century BC
3rd-century BC establishments in the Maya civilization
15th-century disestablishments in the Maya civilization
Maya sites that survived the end of the Classic Period